The Leipzig class was a class of two light cruisers of the German Reichsmarine and later Kriegsmarine; the class comprised Leipzig, the lead ship, and Nürnberg, which was built to a slightly modified design. The ships were improvements over the preceding Königsberg-class cruisers, being slightly larger, with a more efficient arrangement of the main battery and improved armor protection. Leipzig was built between 1928 and 1931, and Nürnberg followed between 1934 and 1935.

Both ships participated in the non-intervention patrols during the Spanish Civil War in 1936 and 1937. After the outbreak of World War II in September 1939, they were used in a variety of roles, including as minelayers and escort vessels. On 13 December, both ships were torpedoed by the British submarine . They were thereafter used in secondary roles, primarily as training ships, for most of the rest of the war. Leipzig provided some gunfire support to German Army troops fighting on the Eastern Front.

Both ships survived the war, though Leipzig was in very poor condition following an accidental collision with the heavy cruiser Prinz Eugen late in the war. Leipzig was therefore used as a barracks ship before being scuttled in 1946. Nürnberg, however, emerged from the war largely unscathed, and as a result, was seized by the Soviet Navy as war reparations, and commissioned into the Soviet fleet as Admiral Makarov; she continued in Soviet service until the late 1950s, and was broken up for scrap by 1960.

Design

General characteristics

The two ships of the Leipzig class were not identical, prompting some naval historians to classify them as separate designs, rather than as a ship class. Of the two, Nürnberg was larger. Her beam was identical to Leipzig, but her draft was slightly greater, at  forward. She displaced  as designed and  fully loaded.

The ships' hulls were divided into fourteen watertight compartments and had double bottoms that ran for 83 percent of the length of their keels. Both vessels had side bulges and bulbous bows. They were constructed with longitudinal steel frames, and were more than 90 percent welded in order to save weight. Nürnberg had a large, blocky forward superstructure, while Leipzigs superstructure resembled that of the preceding . Nürnberg also had a large searchlight platform fitted on the funnel, while Leipzig did not.

Leipzig initially had a crew of 26 officers and 508 enlisted men. Later in her career, the crew grew to 30 officers and 628 sailors and then again to 24 officers and 826 sailors. She could also accommodate an admiral's staff of 6 officers and 20 enlisted men when she was serving as a flagship. Nürnbergs crew started as 25 officers and 648 ratings, and over the course of her career swelled to 26 officers and 870 enlisted men. The ships carried two picket boats, two barges, two launches, and two cutters.

Both ships carried one aircraft catapult for a pair of Heinkel He 60 biplane reconnaissance float planes. They were equipped with a crane to retrieve the aircraft after landing. The He 60s were later replaced by the monoplane Arado Ar 196 by 1939. Leipzigs catapult was located between the funnel and the forward superstructure, while Nürnbergs was placed aft of the funnel.

Machinery and handling

The ships' propulsion system consisted of two steam turbines manufactured by the Deutsche Werke and Germaniawerft shipyards, along with four 7-cylinder double-acting two-stroke diesel engines built by MAN. Steam for the turbines was provided by six Marine-type double-ended, oil-fired, water-tube boilers, which were vented through a single large funnel located amidships.

The ships had extensive electrical generator systems. Leipzig had three power plants that each had a 180 kilowatt turbo-generator and a 180 kW diesel generator; this gave the ship a combined output of 1,080 kW at 220 volts. Nürnberg had four generators which comprised two 300 kW turbo-generators and two 350 kW diesel generators, for a total output of 1,300 kW, also at 220 volts.

Steering was controlled by a single balanced rudder, which gave the ships excellent maneuverability. The rudder was augmented with special steering system on the engine transmissions; they had gears that could drive half of the engines astern and half forward allowed the screws to assist in turning the ship at sharper angles. The ships tended toward lee helm in general conditions, but in heavy wind, they suffered from weather helm. Both vessels also suffered from severe leeway at low speeds, and the effect was especially pronounced for Nürnberg, owing to her larger superstructure.

Armament and armor

Leipzig and Nürnberg were armed with a main battery of nine  SK C/25 guns mounted in three triple gun turrets. One was located forward, and two were placed in a superfiring pair aft, all on the centerline. They were supplied with between 1,080 and 1,500 rounds of ammunition, for between 120 and 166 shells per gun. As built, Leipzig was also equipped with two  SK L/45 anti-aircraft guns in single mounts; they had 800 rounds of ammunition. Nürnberg meanwhile was built with eight of these weapons with 3,200 rounds in total. Nürnberg also carried eight  SK C/30 anti-aircraft guns, and several  anti-aircraft guns, though the number of the latter changed over her career. The two ships also carried four triple torpedo tube mounts located amidships; Leipzig had  weapons while Nürnberg was equipped with  torpedoes. They were supplied with twenty-four torpedoes. They were also capable of carrying 120 naval mines.

Leipzig used Krupp cemented armor, while Nürnberg received the newly developed  ("Wotan", Hard) steel. The belt was inclined to a greater degree than in the preceding Königsbergs, to increase the effectiveness of the same thickness of armor plate.

Modifications

After the outbreak of war, both ships were fitted with a degaussing coil to protect them against magnetic mines. Leipzig had her aircraft equipment removed in 1941, along with her after torpedo tubes. In 1942, Nürnbergs aircraft handling equipment and aft torpedo tubes were also removed. Throughout the war, the ships' radar suites were upgraded; in March 1941, Nürnberg was equipped with FuMO 21 radar and in early 1942, a FuMO 25 radar set was installed. The latter was a search radar for surface targets and low-flying aircraft at low range. The FuMO 21 set was replaced by the short-range FuMO 63 Hohentwiel 50-centimeter radar. Nürnberg was also fitted with four Metox radar warning receivers. Leipzig did not receive her FuMO 24/25 radar set until 1943; this was to be the last modification for Leipzig.

Leipzig had her anti-aircraft armament modernized to bring her closer to the standard of weaponry fitted to her sister. After 1934, two additional 8.8 cm guns were added, with another pair later. Starting in 1941, eight 3.7 cm guns were installed, along with fourteen 2 cm guns. After 1944, she only carried eight of the 2 cm guns. Nürnbergs anti-aircraft battery was improved over the course of World War II. In late 1942, a pair of Army-variant 2 cm Flakvierling quadruple mounts were installed, one on the navigating bridge and the other on top of the aft superfiring turret. In May 1944, the navy proposed installing several Bofors  guns, but most of these weapons were diverted to other uses, and only two guns were installed. One was mounted on the bridge and the other where the catapult had been located. Two Navy-pattern Flakvierlings were added; one replaced the Army model atop the aft superfiring turret, and the other was placed in front of the anti-aircraft fire director. The Army-pattern Flakvierlings were moved to the main deck. In December 1944, another revised anti-aircraft plan was proposed, this time incorporating the new 3.7 cm FlaK 43 gun, of which there were to be eight, along with two Flakvierlings and ten 2 cm twin mounts. Germany's wartime situation by the end of 1944 prevented these changes from being made, however.

Construction

Service history

Leipzig

In the 1930s, Leipzig was used as a training cruiser, as well as to make goodwill visits to foreign ports. She participated in non-intervention patrols during the Spanish Civil War. In late 1939, after the start of World War II, she performed escort duties for warships in the Baltic and North seas. Leipzig was torpedoed by the British submarine  on 13 December while on one of these operations. The cruiser was badly damaged, and the necessary repairs took almost a year to complete. She thereafter resumed her duties as a training ship. She provided gunfire support to the advancing Wehrmacht troops as they invaded the Soviet Union in 1941.

In a heavy fog in October 1944, Leipzig collided with the heavy cruiser Prinz Eugen; the damage was so severe that the navy decided complete repairs were unfeasible. Instead, they repaired Leipzig enough to keep her afloat, and in that state, provided gunfire support to the defenders of Gotenhafen against the advancing Red Army in March 1945. As the Germans continued to retreat in the east, Leipzig was then used to transport a group of fleeing German civilians. She reached Denmark by late April. After the end of the war, Leipzig was used as a barracks ship for minesweeping forces and was scuttled in July 1946.

Nürnberg

Following her commissioning, Nürnberg participated in the non-intervention patrols during the Spanish Civil War; she completed her patrols without major incident and returned to Germany in mid-1937. After the outbreak of World War II in September 1939, she was used to lay defensive minefields off the German coast in the North Sea. She was thereafter used to escort offensive mine-layers in the North Sea until she was torpedoed by the British submarine Salmon on 13 December 1939 in the same attack that hit her sister. After repairs were completed in early 1940, Nürnberg returned to active duty as a training ship in the Baltic Sea. She performed this role for most of the rest of the war, apart from a short deployment to Norway from November 1942 to April 1943. In January 1945, she was assigned to mine-laying duties in the Skaggerak, but severe shortages of fuel permitted only one such operation.

After the end of the war, Nürnberg was seized by the Royal Navy and ultimately awarded to the Soviet Union as war reparations. In December 1945, a Soviet crew took over the ship, and the following month took her to Tallinn, where she was renamed Admiral Makarov. She served in the Soviet Navy, first in the 8th Fleet, then as a training cruiser based in Kronstadt. Her ultimate fate is unclear, but by 1960, she had been broken up for scrap. Nürnberg was the second-largest warship of the Kriegsmarine to survive the war intact, after the heavy cruiser Prinz Eugen, and she was the only vessel to see service after the war, albeit in a foreign navy.

Footnotes

References

Further reading
 
 
 
 

Cruiser classes